Harison da Silva Nery or simply Harison (born 2 January 1980 in Belém), is a Brazilian attacking midfielder.

Biography
On 1 March 2010, Harison moved to China and signed a contract with Chengdu Blades

He is the older brother of the fellow retired footballer, Hadson Nery.

Club statistics

References

External links

sambafoot.com profile
 zerozero.pt profile
 Profile at Goiás

1980 births
Living people
Brazilian footballers
Brazilian expatriate footballers
São Paulo FC players
Santa Cruz Futebol Clube players
Urawa Red Diamonds players
Vissel Kobe players
Gamba Osaka players
Guarani FC players
Associação Atlética Ponte Preta players
U.D. Leiria players
Goiás Esporte Clube players
Al-Ahli Saudi FC players
Al-Wehda Club (Mecca) players
Expatriate footballers in Japan
J1 League players
Expatriate footballers in Portugal
Sertãozinho Futebol Clube players
China League One players
Chengdu Tiancheng F.C. players
Changsha Ginde players
Paysandu Sport Club players
Grêmio Barueri Futebol players
Campeonato Brasileiro Série A players
Primeira Liga players
Saudi Professional League players
Expatriate footballers in China
Brazilian expatriate sportspeople in China
Expatriate footballers in Saudi Arabia
Brazilian expatriate sportspeople in Saudi Arabia
Association football midfielders
Sportspeople from Belém